The Jahanbeglu is a Kurdish tribe in Mazandaran Province, Iran. They were amongst several Kurdish tribes that were transplanted from northwestern Iran to Mazandaran in the late 18th century by then ruler of Iran, Agha Mohammad Khan Qajar (1789–1797), in order to protect the province from Turkmen raids.  

According to a British officer after World War I by the name L. S. Fortescue, the Kurdish Jahanbeglu and Modanlu tribes together with the Turkic Usanlu and Gerayli tribes formed a loose Kurdish-Turkic tribal confederation. Altogether, he estimated the four tribes at 2,000 families. After being moved to Mazandaran by Agha Mohammad Khan Qajar, the Jahanbeglu settled between Behshahr (formerly "Ashraf") and Larim to the north of the province's capital Sari. There, they got involved in the cultivation of cotton and rice. However, according to Grigorii Melgunov, who visited Mazandaran in 1858–1860, a group of Jahanbeglu were also found to the southwest of Sari.  

Though the Jahanbeglu and Modanlu were reportedly still able to speak in their original Kurdish dialect by 1922, they had already become significantly assimilated into the native Mazandaranis. In the subsequent decades both tribes had lost their tribal identities to such an extent that when Iraj Afshar-Sistani compiled a list of tribes of Mazandaran in 1987, they were not even mentioned.

Notes

References

Sources
 

History of Mazandaran Province
Kurdish tribes